Brennan Brown (born November 23, 1968) is an American film, television, and stage actor. He currently plays Dr. Samuel Abrams on NBC's Chicago Med. He played Robert Childan on Amazon's Man in the High Castle.

Career 
He received his MFA in acting from the Yale School of Drama.

He first came to widespread attention in the UK for playing "Mr. Dresden" the spoof film board executive in Orange UK's long-running series of cinema adverts. Brown's other film and television credits include I Love You Phillip Morris with Jim Carrey; Focus opposite Will Smith and Margot Robbie; State of Play; Turn the River; two seasons playing Edward Biben on Amazon's Mozart in the Jungle; HBO's John Adams playing Robert Treat Paine; and two seasons playing Special Agent Nicholas Donnelly on Person of Interest.

Brown has appeared in numerous Broadway and Off-Broadway stage productions. At the Atlantic Theater he appeared in Harold Pinter's Celebration and Ethan Cohen's Offices. At the National Actor's Theater he appeared in Aeschylus' The Persians and Pirandello's Right You Are (If You Think You Are). He played Snobby Price in The Roundabout Theatre Company's Major Barbara.

Filmography

Theater
 Played David in Owen O'Neill's Absolution in 2002.
 Played Richard III in the play of the same name, and Tomas in The Imaginary Invalid at Yale Repertory Theatre.
 Played Snobby Price in the Broadway production of Major Barbara.
 Performed in New York in the play The Second Man at the Keen Theatre, as well as in Asylum and Fair Night at Naked Angels

Videogames
 Manhunt 2 - Watchdogs member (2007)
 Red Dead Redemption - Strange Man, The Local Population (2010)

References

External links
 
 Brennan's American Repertory Theater profile

American male film actors
American male stage actors
American male television actors
Male actors from Los Angeles
1968 births
Living people
Yale School of Drama alumni